Gerino da Pistoia, also Gerino di Antonio Gerini, (1480–1529) was an Italian painter and designer of the Renaissance.

Biography
Not much is known about Gerino except through his works and a few lines by Giorgio Vasari. Gerino was a pupil of Pietro Perugino and trained in his workshop. He traveled to Rome with Pinturicchio.

The Courtauld Gallery was awarded a grant in 2011 to restore and study a surviving work of his Virgin and Child between Saint John the Baptist and Saint John the Evangelist (1510) which was originally made for the church of Sant'Agostino in Sansepolcro.

Some of his works include:
 Madonna with St. Michael and St. Peter, in the annex to the oratory of the church of San Alessandro in Milan
 Madonna (1502), painted relief, Museo Civico, Sansepolcro
 San Jacopo, Basilica of Our Lady of Humility
 Madonna and Child with Saints Anthony Abbot and Nicolas of Bari, church San Giorgio a Porciano, Lamporecchio
 Miracle of the Loaves and Fishes (1513), fresco in dining hall of the convent San Lucchese, Poggibonsi
 St Jerome Penitent, Museum of the Cathedral of San Zeno, Pistoia
 Franciscan saints, fifty medallions by Gerino and his students (1501–1509), corridor of the convent of the sanctuary of Chiusi della Verna

References

 Jodie Rogers Mariotti, historienne d'art, spécialiste de Gerino from Pistoia Pistoia Gerino from the Verna. A sixteenth-century fresco cycle in the light returned, Ed. Pazzini, 2007

1480 births
1529 deaths
15th-century Italian painters
Italian male painters
16th-century Italian painters
Fresco painters